Deng Tingzhen (1776–1846) was a Chinese politician who served as the Governor-General of Liangguang (Guangdong and Guangxi) from early 1836 until early 1840.

References 
 

1776 births
1846 deaths
Qing dynasty politicians from Jiangsu
People of the First Opium War
Politicians from Nanjing
Political office-holders in Guangdong
Viceroys of Liangguang
Viceroys of Liangjiang
Viceroys of Min-Zhe
Viceroys of Shaan-Gan
Viceroys of Yun-Gui